HU-345 (cannabinol quinone) is a drug that is able to inhibit aortic ring angiogenesis more potently than its parent compound cannabinol (CBN).  It exhibits no psychoactive effects on the body.

HU-345 can be derived through the oxidative degradation of CBN.

See also 
HU-331
HU-336

References 

Angiogenesis inhibitors
HU cannabinoids